The 1941 LSU Tigers football team was an American football team that represented Louisiana State University (LSU) in the Southeastern Conference (SEC) during the 1941 college football season. In their seventh season under head coach Bernie Moore, the Tigers compiled a 4–4–2 record (2–2–2 against SEC opponents), finished seventh in the conference, and outscored opponents by a total of 119 to 93. The team played its home games at Tiger Stadium in Baton Rouge, Louisiana.

Senior center Bernie Lipkis was selected as the team's most valuable player. Triple-threat tailback Leo Bird placed second, and fullback Walt Gorinski placed third. Gorinski later played professional football for the Pittsburgh Steelers.

Schedule

References

LSU
LSU Tigers football seasons
LSU Tigers football